Meconta District is a district of Nampula Province in north-eastern Mozambique. The principal town is Meconta.

Further reading
District profile 

Districts in Nampula Province